Athletics competitions at the 2009 Pacific Mini Games were held at the Bank of the Cook Islands National Stadium in Rarotonga, Cook Islands, between September 22–26, 2009.

A total of 41 events were contested, 21 by men and 20 by women.

Medal summary
Medal winners and their results were published on the Oceania Athletics Association webpage by Bob Snow.

Complete results can also be found on the Oceania Athletics Association, and on the Cook Islands Sports and National Olympic Committee webpages.

Men

Women

Medal table (unofficial)

Participation
The official start list contains 175 athletes from 17 countries.  However, in the result lists, the announced 9 athletes from Guam did not appear, but only athletes from the following 16 countries:

 (21)
 (31)
 (25)
 (7)
 (2)
 (5)
/ (18)
 (7)
 (1)
 (4)
 (5)
 (13)
 (15)
 (5)
 (3)
/ (4)

Notes
 Medals were not awarded to place-getters in events where insufficient competitors took part. Five events (Men: 3,000 metre Steeplechase, 4 × 400 metre Relay and Octathlon; Women: 10,000 metre and 4 × 100 metre Relay) had only three competitors, and one event (Women's 4 × 400 metre Relay) had only two competitors. As recorded in the list of medal winners on the official website, those events with three competitors had no bronze medal awarded, and the event with two competitors had no silver or bronze awarded (: While the athletes' names on the official website's list of medal winners appear correct, their recorded nationalities are mismatched in  some cases. e.g. New Caledonians are listed as from Federated States of Micronesia, Fijians are listed as from Niue).

References

External links
Pacific Mini Games 2009 - Athletics
Pacific Games Council
Oceania Athletics Association

Athletics at the Pacific Mini Games
Athletics in the Cook Islands
Pacific Mini Games
2009 in Cook Islands sport
2009 Pacific Mini Games